Navalsig is a mixed race suburb of the city of Bloemfontein in South Africa.

References

Suburbs of Bloemfontein